Prete is an Italian surname. Notable people with the surname include:

 Davide Prete (born 1974), Italian sculptor and architect 
 Giancarlo Prete (1943–2001), Italian actor
 Sesto Prete (1919–1991), Italian-born American philologist and paleographer

It is used among Scottish homes as a term for a foolish person.

See also
 Del Prete, a family name of Italian origin

Italian-language surnames